Cassius Felix, also Cassius Felix of Cirta, was a Roman African medical writer probably native of Constantina. He is known for having written in AD 447 a Latin treatise titled De Medicina. The little we can say of the author comes from his book, that is meant to be a simple handbook for practical use in which he wants others to be able to take advantage of his experience as a physician. His work appears to draw heavily, both directly and indirectly, on Greek medical sources, as was common in the African school of medicine.

A Christian by faith, he may be the person mentioned in passing in the anonymous De miraculis Sancti Stephani, a work written between 418 and 427, where a certain Felix is referred as holding the high medical dignity of archiater, or chief doctor of his community.

The editio princeps of his work was first published in 1879 in a Teubner edition edited by Valentin Rose.

The name Cassius Felix is sometimes also applied to Cassius Iatrosophista, an earlier Greek medical writer (2nd or 3rd century AD) known only as the author of 84 or 85 Quaestiones Medicae et Problemata Naturalia.

References

External links
 Cassius Felix, ed. Rose 1879
 Cassius Iatrosophista, ed. Ideler 1841

5th-century Roman physicians
5th-century Latin writers
Felix